This is a list of notable members of the Theta Delta Chi fraternity. Names are listed followed by the school attended and the graduation year.

Arts
 John Brougham, New York Graduate 1857, 19th century actor, dramatist, and orator
 Fitz James O'Brien, New York Graduate 1857, New York Literary Bohemian, science fiction pioneer
 Robert Frost, Dartmouth 1896, four time Pulitzer Prize winning poet

 Alexander Woollcott, Hamilton 1896, drama critic NY Times, Herald-Tribune, Sun.
 Norman H. Hackett, Michigan 1898, actor
 Stanton Griffis, Cornell 1910, former Chairman of Board of Paramount Pictures and Madison Square Garden
 Arthur Hornblow, Jr., Dartmouth 1915, film producer Paramount and MGM
 Eric Johnston, Washington 1917, President of US Chamber of Commerce, Motion Picture Association of America
 Pat Ballard, Penn 1922, composer of the #1 song of 1954 "Mr. Sandman"
 Frank Thomas, Stanford 1933, Thumpers (Bambi) creator
 John Dunning, UCLA 1939, film editor, Oscar winner for Ben Hur
 Tad Mosel, Amherst 1944, Pulitzer Prize for All the Way Home
 Gardner McKay, Cornell 1953, actor, drama critic
 John Nichols, Hamilton 1962, author The Milagro Bean Field War The Sterile Cuckoo
 Joseph J. Ellis, William and Mary 1965, author Founding Brothers, American Sphinx, His Excellency
 James Woods, MIT 1969, actor
 Kary Antholis, Bowdoin 1984, documentary producer
 Chip Esten, William and Mary 1987, actor/comedian, Whose Line Is It Anyway?
 Sendhil Ramamurthy, Tufts 1996, actor from Heroes
 Hasan Piker, Rutgers 2013, Twitch streamer and political commentator

Medicine
 Frank Lahey, Harvard 1904, Founder of Boston's Lahey Clinic

 Park Dietz, Cornell 1970, Renowned Forensic Psychologist

Public life
 Allen Beach, Union 1849, Lt. Governor of New York, Secretary of State of New York
 John C. Nicholls, William and Mary 1853, Georgia (Rep.)
 William D. Bloxham, William and Mary 1854, Governor of Florida
 Clement Hall Sinnickson, Union 1855, New Jersey (Rep.)
 Frederick George Bromberg, Harvard 1858, Alabama (Rep.)
 John Hay, Brown 1858, Abraham Lincoln's secretary, Secretary of State
 Henry J. Spooner, Brown 1860, Rhode Island (Rep.)
 William W. Thomas, Jr., Bowdoin 1860, US Minister (Ambassador) to Norway and Sweden
 Henry R. Gibson, Hobart 1862, Tennessee (Rep.)
 Daniel N. Lockwood, Union 1865, New York (Rep.)
 John Bayard McPherson, Princeton 1866, Judge, US Court of Appeals
 Hosea M. Knowlton, Tufts 1867, Chief Prosecutor in Lizzie Borden case, Attorney General of Massachusetts 
 John W. Griggs, Lafayette 1868, Governor of New Jersey, Attorney General
 Nathan F. Dixon, III, Brown 1869, US Senator from Rhode Island
 John Bellamy, Virginia 1875, Senator North Carolina
 Walter R. Stiness, Brown 1877, Rhode Island (Rep.)
 James McLachlan, Hamilton 1878, California (Rep.)
 Thomas B. Kyle, Dartmouth 1880, Ohio (Rep.)
 Frederick C. Stevens, Bowdoin 1881, Minnesota (Rep.)
 Daniel J. McGillicuddy, Bowdoin 1881, Maine (Rep.)
 John A. Dix, Cornell 1883, Governor of New York
 Gonzalo de Quesada, CCNY 1888, architect of Cuban Independence Movement (statue at Havana Park)

 John H. Bartlett, Dartmouth 1894, Governor of New Hampshire
 Joseph Irwin France, Hamilton 1895, US Senator from Maryland
 Rollin B. Sanford, Tufts 1897, New York (Rep.)
 James A. Hamilton, Rochester 1898, New York Secretary of State 
 Harlan W. Rippey, Rochester 1898, US District Court Judge/New York Court of Appeal Judge
 Earle S. Warner, Hobart 1902, New York Supreme Court Justice
 Arthur W. Coolidge, Tufts 1903, Lieutenant Governor of Massachusetts
 William F. Love, Rochester 1903, New York Supreme Court Justice
 Frank Henry Buck, Berkeley 1907, California (Dem.)
 Maurice E. Crumpacker, Michigan 1909, Oregon (Rep.)
 Allen J. Furlow, Michigan 1916, Minnesota (Rep.)
 Eric Johnston, Washington 1917, US Chamber of Commerce President
 Irving M. Ives, Hamilton 1919, Senator New York
 Louis P. Beaubien, McGill 1925, Senator of Canada from Quebec
 Lane Dwinell, Dartmouth 1928, Governor of New Hampshire
 Herman T. Schneebeli, Dartmouth 1930, Pennsylvania (Rep.)
 Philleo Nash, Wisconsin 1932, Presidential Adviser for Franklin Roosevelt and Harry Truman, led integration of US Armed Forces 
 Henry P. Smith, Dartmouth 1933, New York (Rep.)

 John W. Tuthill, William and Mary 1932, Ambassador to Brazil
 Alvin M. Bentley, Michigan 1940, Michigan (Rep.)
 Robert L. Leggett, Berkeley 1948, California (Rep.)
 Thomas R. Pickering, Bowdoin 1953, U.S. Ambassador to the United Nations
 Jerry Lewis, UCLA 1956, California (Rep.)
 Wesley C. Uhlman, Washington 1956, Mayor of Seattle
 Hugh Rodham, Penn State 1972, Public Defender and Brother of Hillary Rodham Clinton
 Bruce Rauner, Dartmouth 1978, Governor of Illinois
 Michael K. Powell, William and Mary 1985, Chairman of the US Federal Communications Commission

Education
 Elmer H. Capen, Tufts 1860, President of Tufts University
 William Leslie Hooper, Tufts 1877, Acting President of Tufts University 
 Frederick W. Hamilton, Tufts 1880, President of Tufts University 
 Ernest W. Huffcut, Cornell 1884, Dean of Cornell Law School, Legal Advisor to New York Governor Charles Evans Hughes
 Alexander Meiklejohn, Brown 1893, President of Amherst College
 Guy S. Ford, Wisconsin 1895, President of University of Minnesota, Phi Beta Kappa
 Hollis Godfrey, Tufts 1895, President of Drexel University
 Samuel P. Capen, Tufts 1898, President of the University of Buffalo
 Frank E. Compton, Wisconsin 1898, Creator of Compton's Encyclopedia
 Edmund Ezra Day, Dartmouth 1905, President of Cornell University
 Chauncey S. Boucher, Michigan 1909, President of University of West Virginia/Chancellor of the University of Nebraska
 Robert E. Doherty, Illinois 1909, President of Carnegie Mellon University
 Erwin Schell, MIT 1912, Dean of MIT Department of Business and Engineering
 Leonard Carmichael, Tufts 1921, President of Tufts University, Secretary of Smithsonian
 Alvin D. Chandler, William and Mary 1922, President of College of William and Mary
 Francis H. Horn, Dartmouth 1930, President of the University of Rhode Island
 Norman Topping, Washington 1930, Chancellor of the University of Southern California
 Julian Gibbs, Amherst 1946, President of Amherst College
 Richard M. Freeland, Amherst 1963, President of Northeastern University

Scholarship
 William Leete Stone, Jr., Brown 1858, historian
 Stephen M. Babcock, Tufts 1886, inventor of the Babcock Centrifuge (butterfat testing)
 Henry Crampton, CCNY 1893,  paleontologist and evolutionary biologist
 Herbert E. Bolton, Wisconsin 1895, President of the American Historical Association
 Carlos Baker, Dartmouth 1932, Hemingway biographer, scholar of Princeton University

 Lester C. Thurow, Williams 1960, Dean of the MIT Sloan School of Management

Military
 Raymond W. Bliss, Tufts 1910, former Surgeon General of the U.S. Army
 Silas B. Hays, Iowa State 1924, former Surgeon General of the United States Army
 Arthur Japy Hepburn, Dickinson 1896, Admiral Commander in Chief of the U.S. Fleet
 William Lamb, William and Mary 1853, Civil War "Hero of Fort Fisher"
 Benjamin P. Lamberton, Dickinson 1862, Admiral U.S. Navy
 Donald B. MacMillan, Bowdoin 1897, Arctic explorer, Rear Admiral, U.S.N.
 Robert Lee Scott Jr., Arizona State 1932, U.S. General
 Franklin Guest Smith, Rensselaer Polytechnic Institute 1859, U.S. Army brigadier general
 Eben Swift, Dickinson 1874, Major General U.S. Army
 Henry Goddard Thomas, Bowdoin 1858, Brigadier General U.S. Army first regular officer to command United States Colored Troops

Architecture
 John William Merrow, Dartmouth 1897
 Raymond M. Hood, Brown 1902, Rockefeller Center and Chicago Tribune

Business
 Howard Melville Hanna, Union 1859, President of M.A. Hanna Co. and Globe Iron Works
 Eugene Grace, Lehigh 1899, Chairman of the Board of Bethlehem Steel
 Harvey Dow Gibson, Bowdoin 1902, President of the Manufacturers Trust Co

 Dwight Follett, Illinois 1925, President of Follett Corporation
 Charles C. Tillinghast Jr., Brown 1932, President of TWA, Chancellor of Brown University
 Charles K. Fletcher Jr., Stanford 1950, Chairman of the Home Federal Saving Assoc
 Mark H. McCormack, William and Mary 1950, CEO International Management Group
 William J. Henry, William and Mary 1963, President Time Life Books, Inc.
 Michael R. Burns, Arizona State 1980, Vice Chairman of Lionsgate
 Jack D. Furst, Arizona State 1981, Partner of Hicks, Muse, Tate & Furst Inc.
 Michael J. Saylor, MIT 1987, Founder MicroStrategy
 Tom First, Brown 1989, Co-founder of Nantucket Nectars
 Tom Scott, Brown 1989, Co-founder of Nantucket Nectars

Engineering and science
 Alexander Lyman Holley, Brown 1853, Bessemer Steel, statue in Washington Square, NYC
 Frederick Vernon Coville, Cornell 1887, Botanist, Founder of the United States National Arboretum
 William Henry Brewer, Yale 1889, Botanist, Chair of Agriculture at Yale
 Charles Hook Tompkins, George Washington 1906, Founder of Charles H. Tompkins Construction Company
 Dan Geer, MIT 1972, computer security specialist
 Peter Diamandis, MIT 1983, space flight entrepreneur

Sport
 Edward Marsh, Lehigh 1894, gold medalist 1900 Olympics – rowing
 William Wilson Talcott, Michigan 1901, Quarterback of team inspiring "The Victors"
 Harold A. Fisher, CCNY 1902, College Basketball Hall of Fame Member, author of first college basketball rules
 Edward Lindberg, Tufts 1909, gold and bronze medalist at the 1912 Olympics - track
 Wally Snell, Brown 1913, player Boston Red Sox
 Leon Tuck, Dartmouth 1915, silver medalist 1920 Olympics – hockey
 Jackson Keefer, Brown 1925, All-American 1924, 1925, early NFL player Providence Steam Roller 1926, Dayton Triangles 1928 
 Walter Francis O'Malley, Pennsylvania 1926, owner of Brooklyn/LA Dodgers
 William F. McAfee, Jr., Michigan 1929, player Chicago White Sox
 John W. Allyn, Lafayette 1939, owner of Chicago White Sox
 Donald Canham, Michigan 1941, University of Michigan Athletic Director
 Harry Dalton, Amherst 1950, Executive VP Milwaukee Brewers
 William P. Ficker, Berkeley 1950, Winner of America's Cup Race
 Benjamin L. Abruzzo, Illinois 1952, Crewmember of "Double Eagle II" (first trans-Atlantic balloon flight)
 Mark Donohue, Brown 1959, Indianapolis 500 Winner
 Darrin Nelson, Stanford 1981, Stanford All-American, player Minnesota Vikings
 Jeffrey L. Ballard, Stanford 1982, baseball player for Baltimore Orioles
 Chuck Muncie, Berkeley 1975, player New Orleans Saints and San Diego Chargers
 James Lofton, Stanford 1978, NFL wide receiver, 2004 NFL Hall of Fame Inductee

 Garin Veris, Stanford 1985, player New England Patriots and San Francisco 49ers
 John Brody, Tufts 1995, Major League Baseball Senior VP of Corporate Sales and Marketing
 Sean Morey, Brown 1999, player New England Patriots, Philadelphia Eagles, Pittsburgh Steelers, Arizona Cardinals 1999–present
 Chas Gessner, Brown 2003, player New England Patriots, Tampa Bay Buccaneers 2003–present
 Nick Thompson, Wisconsin 2004, MMA fighter, Bodog Fight, UFC, EliteXC
 Zak DeOssie, Brown 2007, player 2007 4th round draft pick New York Giants

Clergy
 Rt. Rev. John H. D. Wingfield, William and Mary 1853, Bishop of North Carolina
 Rt. Rev. A. M. Randolph, William and Mary 1855, Bishop of Virginia
 Henry Christopher McCook, Washington and Jefferson 1859, Presbyterian clergyman, naturalist, and prolific author on religion, history, and nature
 David Gregg, Washington and Jefferson 1865, Presbyterian clergyman, pastor of Park Street Church
 Rev. Franklin Clark Fry, Hamilton 1921, President of the Lutheran Church of America
 Rt. Rev. Robert C. Rusack, Hobart 1947, Bishop of Los Angeles

References

Theta Delta Chi
Theta Delta Chi